Ocneria detrita is a moth of the subfamily Lymantriinae. The species was first described by Eugenius Johann Christoph Esper in 1785. It is found in France, Italy and parts of central, south-east and eastern Europe.

The wingspan is 30–34 mm. Adult males have a brownish-grey ground colour with dark markings. Females are similar in colour, but lack any markings. Adults are on wing from the beginning of June to the end of September in one generation per year.

The larvae feed on Quercus species. They have a dark, almost black, body and head. The species overwinters in the larval stage.

References

Further reading 
Eckstein, Karl (1913-33).Die Schmetterlinge Deutschlands mit besonderer Berücksichtigung ihrer Biologie. K. G. Lutz, Stuttgart.

Lymantriinae
Moths described in 1785
Moths of Europe
Moths of Asia
Taxa named by Eugenius Johann Christoph Esper